Artūrs Dārznieks (born 20 April 1993) is a Latvian luger. He competed in the men's singles event at the 2018 Winter Olympics, and at the 2022 Winter Olympics.

References

External links

1993 births
Living people
Latvian male lugers
Olympic lugers of Latvia
Lugers at the 2018 Winter Olympics
Lugers at the 2022 Winter Olympics
People from Jēkabpils